Andrew Putna (born October 21, 1994) is an American professional soccer player.

Career

College and amateur
Putna played college soccer at the University of Illinois at Chicago between 2013 and 2016, and in the USL Premier Development League with Chicago Fire U-23.

Professional
Putna was drafted in the third round (48th overall) of the 2017 MLS SuperDraft by Real Salt Lake. He joined Salt Lake's United Soccer League affiliate Real Monarchs in March 2017.

On July 13, 2018, Putna moved to Real Salt Lake.

References

External links
 
 

1994 births
Living people
American soccer players
Association football goalkeepers
Chicago Fire U-23 players
People from Lemont, Illinois
Real Monarchs players
Real Salt Lake draft picks
Real Salt Lake players
Soccer players from Illinois
Sportspeople from DuPage County, Illinois
UIC Flames men's soccer players
USL Championship players
USL League Two players
Major League Soccer players